Filippo Volandri was the defending champion, but he lost to Daniel Köllerer in the second round.
Andreas Seppi defeated Potito Starace 7–6(4), 2–6, 6–4 in the final.

Seeds

Draw

Final four

Top half

Bottom half

References
 Main Draw
 Qualifying Draw

San Marino CEPU Open - Singles